The men's 100 metres at the 2000 Summer Olympics as part of the athletics program were held at the Stadium Australia from 22 to 23 September. Ninety-seven athletes from 71 nations competed. Each nation was limited to 3 athletes per rules in force since the 1930 Olympic Congress. The event was won by American Maurice Greene, the United States's first title in the event since 1988 and 15th overall. Ato Boldon of Trinidad and Tobago improved on his 1996 bronze with a silver in Sydney. Obadele Thompson won the first-ever medal in the men's 100 metres for Barbados with bronze.

Background

This was the twenty-fourth time the event was held, having appeared at every Olympics since the first in 1896. Two finalists from 1996 returned: defending gold medalist Donovan Bailey of Canada and bronze medalist Ato Boldon of Trinidad and Tobago. Two-time silver medalist Frankie Fredericks of Namibia was injured and unable to compete. The United States team was led by reigning world champion (1997 and 1999) and world record holder Maurice Greene. Boldon, the 1998 Commonwealth champion, was the main challenger to Greene.

Albania, American Samoa, Brunei, Croatia, Georgia, Guam, Palau, and Saint Lucia appeared in the event for the first time. The United States made its 23rd appearance in the event, most of any country, having missed only the boycotted 1980 Games.

Qualification

The qualification period for athletics took place between 1 January 1999 to 11 September 2000. For the men's 100 metres, each National Olympic Committee was permitted to enter up to three athletes that had run the race in 10.27 seconds or faster during the qualification period. If an NOC had no athletes that qualified under that standard, one athlete that had run the race in 10.40 seconds or faster could be entered.

Competition format

The event retained the same basic four round format introduced in 1920: heats, quarterfinals, semifinals, and a final. The "fastest loser" system, introduced in 1968, was used again to ensure that the quarterfinals and subsequent rounds had exactly 8 runners per heat; this time, the system was used in both the heats and quarterfinals.

The first round consisted of 11 heats, each with 9 athletes scheduled (1 heats had 7 actually run due to withdrawals). The top three runners in each heat advanced, along with the next seven fastest runners overall; due to a tie for the final "fastest loser" place, both men advanced. This made 41 quarterfinalists, who were divided into 5 heats of 8 runners, with an extra runner in one heat due to the tie. The top three runners in each quarterfinal advanced, with one "fastest loser" place. The 16 semifinalists competed in two heats of 8, with the top four in each semifinal advancing to the eight-man final.

Records
, the existing World and Olympic records were as follows.

No new records were set during the competition.

Schedule

All times are Australian Eastern Daylight Time (UTC+11:00)

Results

Round 1
Qualification rule: The first three finishers in each heat (Q) plus the seven (eight, after a tie for the seventh place occurred) fastest times of those who finished fourth or lower in their heat (q) qualified.

Heat 1

Heat 2

Heat 3

Heat 4

Heat 5

Heat 6

Heat 7

Heat 8

Heat 9

Heat 10

Heat 11

Quarterfinals
Qualification rule: The first three finishers in each heat (Q) plus the next fastest overall sprinter (q) qualified.

Quarterfinal 1

Quarterfinal 2

Quarterfinal 3

Quarterfinal 4

Quarterfinal 5

Semifinals
Qualification rule: The first four runners in each semifinal heat (Q) moves on to the final.

Semifinal 1

Semifinal 2

Final 

Zakari was injured at about the 35 metre mark and did not finish.

References

External links
Official Report of the 2000 Sydney Summer Olympics

100 metres, Men's
100 metres at the Olympics
Men's events at the 2000 Summer Olympics